Yuri Aleksandrovich Gorshkov (born 13 March 1999) is a Russian football player who plays for PFC Krylia Sovetov Samara.

Club career
He made his debut in the Russian Professional Football League for FC Chertanovo Moscow on 18 August 2016 in a game against FC Energomash Belgorod. He made his Russian Football National League debut for Chertanovo on 17 July 2018 in a game against FC Rotor Volgograd.

He made his Russian Premier League debut for PFC Krylia Sovetov Samara on 25 July 2021 in a game against FC Akhmat Grozny.

Career statistics

References

External links
 
 
 
 Profile by Russian Professional Football League

1999 births
People from Kondopoga
Sportspeople from the Republic of Karelia
Living people
Russian footballers
Association football defenders
Association football midfielders
Russia youth international footballers
FC Chertanovo Moscow players
PFC Krylia Sovetov Samara players
Russian Premier League players
Russian First League players
Russian Second League players